Randa George Yacoub Siniora (born c. 1961) is a Palestinian human rights and women's rights activist. She has documented human rights violations in the occupied Palestinian territories for three decades, and is currently general director of the Women’s Center for Legal Aid and Counseling (WCLAC) in Jerusalem.

Life
Randa Siniora studied at the University of Essex in the United Kingdom, gaining an LLM in International Human Rights Law, and at the American University in Cairo, gaining an MA degree in Sociology-Anthropology. Her MA thesis, a study of women textile workers in the West Bank, producing goods for Israeli companies, was later published by the American University. Here Siniora applied the dependency theory of Arghiri Emmanuel and Samir Amin to the Palestinian situation. To explain the relatively low levels of political and labour organization amongst women, she emphasised the social continuities of the patriarchal structures which controlled women at home and at work: 

From 1987 to 1997 Siniora was Legal Researcher and Coordinator of the Women's Rights Program at the human rights organization Al-Haq. Her efforts to build consensus on the need for legal changes to protect women were interrupted by the First Intifada:

From 1997 to 2001 Siniora was Head of Networking and Advocacy at the Women's Center for Legal Aid and Counseling. From 2001 to 2005 she was General Director of Al-Haq.

From September 2007 until June 2015 Siniora was the Senior Executive Director of the Independent Commission for Human Rights (ICHR) in Palestine. In 2015 she became General Director of the Women’s Center for Legal Aid and Counseling.

In October 2018 Siniora became the first female Palestinian campaigner to address the United Nations Security Council. Siniora raised the issue of the high rate of domestic violence, and the increasing rate of femicide in the occupied territories. She also raised the broader issue of women's political exclusion:

Works
 Palestinian Labor in a Dependent Economy: Women Workers in the West Bank Clothing Industry. Cairo Papers in Social Science, Vol. 12, Monograph 3. Cairo: American University in Cairo Press.
 'Lobbying for a Palestinian Family Law: The Experience of the Palestinian Model Parliament: Women and Legislation'. Paper for the Conference on Islamic Family Law in the Middle East and North Africa, Amman, 2000.

References

External links
 Randa Siniora, General Director of Al Haq. Video of talk at Duke University

1961 births
Year of birth uncertain
Living people
Palestinian human rights activists
Palestinian feminists
Alumni of the University of Essex
The American University in Cairo alumni